The 161st Virginia General Assembly, consisting of members who were elected in both the House election and Senate election in 2019, convened on January 8, 2020. It was the first time Democrats held both houses of the General Assembly and the governorship since the 147th General Assembly in 1993.

A special session was called by Governor Ralph Northam for August 18, 2020 to make budget cuts and pass bills for criminal justice reform, racial justice, affordable housing and COVID-19 protections. The special session ended on November 9, 2020. After a shorter 30-day session occurred from January to February 2021, Northam called for another special session which lasted until March. After the onset of the COVID-19 pandemic, the State Capitol was closed to the public and sessions were re-located to alternative buildings.

Membership

On November 9, 2019, Eileen Filler-Corn was nominated by the Democratic majority caucus for Speaker of the House of Delegates, and upon election by the House on January 8, she became the first woman and first Jew to be elected Speaker. Concurrently, Charniele Herring was elected as Majority Leader, making her the first woman and first African-American to serve as Majority Leader.

In addition, Ghazala Hashmi became the first Muslim woman to be elected to the Senate. Incumbent Danica Roem became the first transgender legislator to be re-elected to office in U.S. history.

In total, the 161st General Assembly has the highest number of women elected to both bodies, with 30 in the House and 11 in the Senate. 

Speaker Filler-Corn selected Del. Luke Torian to be the first African-American House Appropriations Chair in state history. This was the first time that an African-American delegate was selected to chair a House committee since William P. Robinson Jr. (D-Norfolk) chaired the Transportation Committee in 1998 and was co-chairman of the panel in 1998, according to House Clerk G. Paul Nardo.

Leadership

Senate
 Senate Majority Leader: Dick Saslaw (D)
 Senate Minority Leader: Tommy Norment (R)
 Senate Majority Caucus Chair: Mamie Locke (D)
 Senate President pro-tempore: L. Louise Lucas (D)
 Senate Majority Caucus Vice Chair: Scott Surovell (D)
 Senate Majority Caucus Vice Chair for Policy: Jeremy McPike (D)
 Senate Majority Caucus Secretary: Jennifer McClellan (D)
 Senate Majority Caucus Treasurer: Ghazala Hashmi (D)
 Senate Majority Whips: Barbara Favola (D) and Lionell Spruill (D)
 Senate Majority Sergeant at Arms: Jennifer Boysko (D)
 Clerk: Susan Clarke Schaar

Committee chairs and ranking members
The Senate of Virginia has 10 Standing Committees and a Committee on Rules.

House of Delegates
 Speaker: Eileen Filler-Corn (D)
 House Majority Leader: Charniele Herring (D)
 House Majority Caucus Chair: Rip Sullivan (D)
 House Minority Leader: Todd Gilbert (R)
 House Minority Whip: Jay Leftwich (R)
 House Minority Caucus Chair: Kathy Byron (R)
 Clerk: Suzette Denslow

Committee chairs and ranking members
The House has 14 standing committees.

Legislation
Pre-filing of bills for the 2020 session began November 18, 2019. 828 bills were passed by the House by crossover day on February 12, 2020, an increase from the 603 bills passed under the Republican majority in the 2019 session.

Enacted
 January 27, 2020: HJ 1/SJ 1: Resolution to ratify the Equal Rights Amendment to the United States Constitution
 February 24, 2020: HB 35/SB 103: Restores parole eligibility to those serving 20 years of a sentence for crimes committed as a juvenile and for which they received a lengthy sentence 
 March 4, 2020: HB 245: Repeals the crime of fornication
 March 2, 2020: HB 61: Provides that an adult sentenced for a juvenile offense can earn good conduct credit at the rate of one day for each one day served.
 March 2, 2020: HB 386: Prohibits the performance of conversion therapy by state-licensed counselors on juveniles under 18
 March 2, 2020: HB 587: Requiring the inclusion of space and equipment for changing babies during plans for new state government buildings
 HB 277: Allowing currently-incarcerated individuals to earn credit towards paying off fines and fees through community work
 HB 1490: Repealing statutory bans on same-sex marriages and civil unions. 
 HB 696: Provides that localities may prohibit discrimination in housing, employment, public accommodations, credit, and education on the basis of sexual orientation and gender identity
 HB 1071: Repeals the crime of profane swearing
 HB 973/SB 600: Repeals several laws enacted from 1901 to 1960 which encoded racial segregation of students in elementary and secondary schools and institutions of higher education in Virginia
 HB 1514/SB 50: Protects hair texture, hair type, and protective hairstyles such as braids, locks, and twists from discrimination (see also: CROWN Act)

Other legislation
Notable bills filed include:
 HB 1: Legalization of no-excuse absentee voting
 HB 2: Regulates firearms transfers and sales through background checks
 HB 3: Prohibits discrimination in housing on the basis of sexual orientation and gender identity
 HB 4: Legalizes and regulates casino gambling in Virginia through the Virginia Lottery Board
 HB 961: Banning sale and transport of assault weapons and high-capacity magazines
 HB 1625: Repealing Virginia's statewide ban on local governments removing or altering Confederate monuments
 SB 2: Decriminalizing cannabis in Virginia
SB 601: Eliminating Lee-Jackson Day and making Election Day a state holiday
SB 240: Red flag law
SB 868: Prohibits LGBT discrimination in employment, housing, credit, and public accommodations 
 HB 177: Joining the National Popular Vote Interstate Compact (consideration moved to 2021 session)

Equal Rights Amendment
HJ 1, prefiled by Jennifer Carroll Foy, and SJ 1, filed by Jennifer McClellan, will make Virginia the 3rd state since 2017 and the 38th overall necessary to ratify the Equal Rights Amendment (counting the five that have since voted to rescind their ratifications). Both bills were given initial approval, with SJ 1 being approved 28-12 in the Senate and HJ 1 being approved 59-41 in the House, and were passed by the other chamber on January 27. All Democrats and several Republicans in both chambers voted in favor of the resolutions. However, experts and advocates have acknowledged legal uncertainty about the consequences of Virginia's potential ratification, due to the expired deadlines and the five states' purported revocations.

Events
A peaceful protest opposing gun control legislation occurred outside the Virginia State Capitol on January 20, 2020.

Changes in membership
 Del. Chris Collins (R-HD29) resigned on June 28, 2020 to accept an appointment as a judge to Virginia's 26th Judicial District. He was succeeded by Bill Wiley. 
 Del. Joseph C. Lindsey (D-HD90) resigned on November 15, 2020 after being appointed to the Norfolk General District Court. He was succeeded by Angelia Williams Graves.
 Del. Jennifer Carroll Foy (D-HD2) resigned on December 12, 2020 to focus on her campaign for governor. She was succeeded by Candi King.
 Senator Ben Chafin (R-SD38) died from COVID-19-related symptoms on January 1, 2021. He was succeeded by Travis Hackworth.

See also
 List of Virginia state legislatures

References

External links
 Bills filed for the 2020 Session

Government of Virginia
Virginia legislative sessions
2020 in Virginia
Virginia
2021 in Virginia
Virginia